First Tape is the first album by The Lucksmiths, originally released on cassette in December 1993 and released on CD in 1996 on Candle Records (catalogue number LUCKY3.)

Track listing
Music by Tali White and Martin Donald.  Lyrics as noted.
 "Clichéd Title for Kris" – 1:39 (Donald)
 "Cat in Sunshine" – 3:30 (Donald)
 "Adolescent Song of Mindless Devotion" – 2:13 (Donald, White)
 "Run Spot Run" – 0:54 (Donald)
 "Weatherboard" – 3:20 (Donald)
 "Andrew's Pleasure" – 1:57 (Donald)
 "Remote Control" – 2:03 (Donald)
 "Tale of Two Cities" – 2:33 (White)
 "Birthday Present for Katrina" – 1:00 (Donald)
 "Scottsdale" – 2:16 (White)
 "English Murder Mystery" – 2:14 (Donald)

References

The Lucksmiths albums
1993 debut albums